Libya competed at the 2014 Summer Youth Olympics, in Nanjing, China from 16 August to 28 August 2014.

Archery

Libya qualified a male archer from its performance at the African Continental Qualification Tournament.

Individual

Team

Athletics

Libya qualified one athlete.

Qualification Legend: Q=Final A (medal); qB=Final B (non-medal); qC=Final C (non-medal); qD=Final D (non-medal); qE=Final E (non-medal)

Boys
Field Events

Weightlifting

Libya qualified 1 quota in the boys' events based on the team ranking after the 2014 Weightlifting Junior & Youth African Championships.

Boys

References

Nations at the 2014 Summer Youth Olympics
2014
Youth Olympics